In sports, 1. Liga, 1. liga, I Liga or Erste Liga may refer to:

Association football
 1. Bundesliga, football league in Germany
 Latvian First League, (1. līga), football league in Latvia
 I liga, the second tier of the Polish football league system
 I liga (women's football), the second tier of the women's Polish football league system
 1. Liga Promotion, the third tier of the Swiss football league system
 1. Liga Classic, the fourth tier of the Swiss football league system
 1. Liga (Slovakia), former name of the second-highest football division in Slovakia
 Austrian Football First League, (German: Erste Liga), the second highest division in Austrian football league system
 Czech First League, the top tier of the Czech football league system

Ice hockey
 Czech 1. Liga, second-highest ice hockey division in the Czech Republic
 Polish 1. Liga, second-highest ice hockey division in Poland
 Slovak 1. Liga, second-highest ice hockey division in Slovakia
 Swiss 1. Liga (ice hockey), third-highest ice hockey league in Switzerland
 Erste Liga (ice hockey), an international ice hockey league

Basketball
 I Liga (basketball), second level basketball league in Poland

Rugby
 I liga Rugby, second-highest rugby union league in Poland

Speedway
Polish Speedway First League, second-highest motorcycle speedway league in Poland

See also
 I Lyga, football league in Lithuania
 A-1 Liga, basketball league in Croatia
 Liga (disambiguation)
 2. Liga (disambiguation)
 3. Liga (disambiguation)
 Prva Liga (disambiguation)
 Liga 1 (disambiguation)
 Liga I, a Romanian professional league for men's association football clubs